Talat or Talaat may refer to:

People
Talat (given name), includes Tallat
Mehmet Ali Talat (born 1952), President of the Turkish Republic of Northern Cyprus
Talat Yaqoob

Geographic designations
Talat Sao, a morning market in Vientiane, Laos

Thailand 
Pak Khlong Talat, a market in Bangkok that sells flowers, fruits, and vegetables
Talat Chaiya, a subdistrict municipality in Chaiya District, Surat Thani Province
Talat Khwan, a subdistrict of Doi Saket District, in Chiang Mai Province
Talat Yai, a subdistrict of Doi Saket District, Chiang Mai Province
Yang Talat District, a district in Kalasin Province
Talat, a subdistrict of Mueang Chanthaburi District, Chanthaburi
Talat, a subdistrict of Mueang Nakhon Ratchasima District, Nakhon Ratchasima
Talat, a subdistrict of Mueang Maha Sarakham District, Maha Sarakham
Talat, a subdistrict of Mueang Surat Thani District, Surat Thani
Talat, a subdistrict of Phra Pradaeng District, Samut Prakan